Go Fly a Kite is the fifth studio album by Ben Kweller, which was released on February 7, 2012. This is his first album since splitting with former label ATO Records.

Reception 
In a review for VZ Magazine, Nicholas Moffitt said, "Fans of Kweller and Power Pop will like Go Fly A Kite" but later added, "I just wish Kweller were more daring." The AllMusic review called it "a refreshing album on a number of levels" because of Kweller's inclusion of "the detailed notes on how to play each song along with the lyrics...keeping nothing, not even the chord progressions, secret."

Track listing

Charts

References

Ben Kweller albums
2012 albums